Dsign Music is a two-times Grammy nominated Norwegian songwriting and production team. Dsign Music was founded in 2005 by Robin Jenssen, Anne Judith Stokke Wik, Nermin Harambašić and Ronny Vidar Svendsen in Trondheim, Norway. Since the start they have scored more than 60 Billboard Chart No.1 placements, accumulated sales of more than 25 million physical albums, generated more than two billion streams, had close to 400 songs recorded and released, winner of YouTube awards, several MTV awards and Golden Disc awards, hundreds of top 10 charting singles and albums, multiple diamond, platinum and gold records. .  Dsign Music was signed to a publishing deal with Universal Music Publishing Group from 2008 to 2016. In 2017, Dsign Music signed their current publishing deal with EKKO Music Rights, the European division of CTGA (Culture Technology Group Asia), where Mr. Jenssen serves as the CEO and co-founder together with Mr. Lee Soo-man (founder of SM Entertainment in Seoul, Korea) and Australian A&R veteran Mr. Hayden Bell (former A&R Executive of Sony Music). Dsign Music is represented by TONO in the Nordics and SESAC for the rest of the world (since 2015).
 Robin Jenssen (CEO)
 Anne Judith Stokke Wik (songwriter/topliner/singer)
 Nermin Harambašić (songwriter/topliner/producer)
 Ronny Vidar Svendsen (songwriter/producer/composer)
 Jin Suk Choi aka JINBYJIN (Head of Asia/songwriter/producer/composer)
 Adrian Thesen aka Heffy Beluga (songwriter/producer)

Billboard #1 Placements
Dsign Music have either written, co-written, produced and/or co-produced more than 60 Billboard number-one chartings.
 05/11/2022: LE SSERAFIM - "Antifragile" - #1 Billboard US World Albums
 26/10/2022: LE SSERAFIM - "Antifragile" - #1 Billboard Japan Top Albums Sales
 26/10/2022: LE SSERAFIM - "Antifragile" - #1 Billboard Japan Hot Albums
 28/05/2022: Tomorrow X Together "Minisode 2: Thursday's Child" - #1 Billboard US Top Current Album Sales
 28/05/2022: Tomorrow X Together "Minisode 2: Thursday's Child" - #1 Billboard US Top Album Sales 
 28/05/2022: Tomorrow X Together "Minisode 2: Thursday's Child" - #1 Billboard US World Albums 
 25/05/2022: Tomorrow X Together "Minisode 2: Thursday's Child" - #1 Billboard Japan Top Albums Sales 
 25/05/2022: Tomorrow X Together "Minisode 2: Thursday's Child" - #1 Billboard Japan Hot Albums 
 11/05/2022: LE SSERAFIM - "Fearless" - #1 Billboard Japan Download Albums
 11/05/2022: LE SSERAFIM - "Fearless" - #1 Billboard Japan Hot Albums
 16/02/2022: Yunho - "You Go Ahead" - #1 Billboard Japan Hot Albums
 16/02/2022: Yunho - "You Go Ahead" - #1 Billboard Japan Top Albums Sales
 27/11/2021: Twice - "F.I.L.A. (Fall in Love Again)" from the album Formula of Love: O+T=<3 - #1 Billboard US World Albums
 09/10/2021: ITZY - "B[oo]m-Boxx" and "Love Is" from the album Crazy In Love - #1 Billboard US World Albums
 09/10/2021: ITZY - "B[oo]m-Boxx" and "Love Is" from the album Crazy In Love - #1 Billboard US Independent Albums
 09/10/2021: ITZY - "B[oo]m-Boxx" and "Love Is" from the album Crazy In Love - #1 Billboard US Tastemaker Albums
 09/10/2021: ITZY - "B[oo]m-Boxx" and "Love Is" from the album Crazy In Love - #1 Billboard US Top Album Sales
 09/10/2021: ITZY - "B[oo]m-Boxx" and "Love Is" from the album Crazy In Love - #1 Billboard US Top Current Album Sales
 26/06/2021: Twice - "Baby Blue Love" from the EP "Taste of Love" - #1 Billboard US World Albums
 26/06/2021: Twice - "Baby Blue Love" from the EP "Taste of Love" - #1 Billboard US Top Album Sales
 26/06/2021: Twice - "Baby Blue Love" from the EP "Taste of Love" - #1 Billboard US Top Current Album Sales
 07/11/2020: Loona - "Fall Again" from the EP "12:00" - #1 Billboard US Heatseekers Albums
 21/12/2019: EXO - "Trouble" from the album "Obsession" - #1 Billboard US World Albums
 18/03/2019: Twice - "Dance The Night Away" from the album "#Twice2" - #1 Billboard Japan Hot Albums
 15/12/2018: Red Velvet - "Sassy Me" from the album "RBB (Really Bad Boy)" - #1 Billboard US Heatseekers Albums
 08/12/2018: NCT 127 - "Simon Says" from the album Regular-Irregular - #1 Billboard US World Digital Songs
 21/07/2018: Twice - "Dance The Night Away" (single) - #1 Billboard K-POP Hot 100
 07/02/2018: EXO - "Love Me Right" from the album "Countdown" - #1 Billboard Japan Top Albums Sales
 07/02/2018: EXO - "Love Me Right" from the album "Countdown" - #1 Billboard Japan Hot Albums
 03/02/2018: Jonghyun - Poet  Artist - #1 Billboard US World Albums
 30/01/2017: Namie Amuro - "Finally" - #1 Billboard Japan Hot Albums
 30/01/2017: Namie Amuro - "Finally" - #1 Billboard Japan Top Albums Sales
 26/08/2017: Girls' Generation - "Holiday Night" - #1 Billboard US World Albums
 25/07/2017: EXO - "The War" - #1 Billboard US World Albums
 30/01/2017: E-girls - E.G. Crazy - #1 Billboard Japan Hot Albums
 30/01/2017: E-girls - E.G. Crazy - #1 Billboard Japan Top Albums Sales
 26/11/2016: B.A.P - "Noir" - #1 Billboard US World Albums
 15/10/2016: Ricky Martin - "Vente Pa'Ca feat. Maluma" (single) - #1 Billboard Mexico Airplay
 15/10/2016: Ricky Martin - "Vente Pa'Ca feat. Maluma" (single) - #1 Billboard Mexico Espanol Airplay
 15/10/2016: Ricky Martin - "Vente Pa'Ca feat. Maluma" (single) - #1 Billboard US Latin Airplay
 15/10/2016: Ricky Martin - "Vente Pa'Ca feat. Maluma" (single) - #1 Billboard US Latin Pop Airplay
 15/10/2016: Ricky Martin - "Vente Pa'Ca feat. Maluma" (single) - #1 Billboard US Tropical Airplay
 11/11/2015: EXO - "Love Me Right" (single) - #1 Billboard Japan Hot 100
 05/11/2015: f(x) - "4 Walls" - #1 Billboard US World Albums
 26/09/2015: Red Velvet - "The Red" - #1 Billboard US World Albums
 05/09/2015: Girls' Generation - "Lion Heart" - #1 Billboard US World Albums
 22/08/2015: Nathan Sykes - "Kiss Me Quick" - #1 Billboard US Dance Club Songs
 31/01/2015: Jonghyun - "Base" - #1 Billboard US World Albums
 04/09/2014: Super Junior - "Mamacita" - #1 Billboard US World Albums
 11/08/2014: Girls' Generation - "The Best" - #1 Billboard Japan Top Albums Sales
 15/03/2014: Girls' Generation - "Mr. Mr." - #1 Billboard US Heatseekers Albums
 17/12/2013: EXO - "Miracles In December" - #1 Billboard US World Albums
 17/08/2013: f(x) - "Rum Pum Pum Pum" (single) - #1 Billboard K-Pop Hot 100
 17/08/2013: f(x) - "Pink Tape" - #1 Billboard US World Albums
 22/06/2013: EXO - "XOXO" - #1 Billboard US World Albums
 08/06/2013: Lee Hyori - "Bad Girls" (single) - #1 Billboard K-POP Hot 100
 26/01/2013: Girls' Generation - "I Got A Boy" (single) - #1 Billboard K-POP Hot 100
 26/01/2013: Super Junior-M - "Break Down" - #1 Billboard US World Albums
 19/01/2013: Girls' Generation - "I Got A Boy" (album) - #1 Billboard US World Albums
 05/10/2011: TVXQ - Tone - #1 Billboard Japan Top Albums Sales
 08/06/2011: Girls' Generation - "Girls' Generation" - #1 Billboard Japan Top Albums Sales

Selected Credits 
 2023: Got the Beat - "Goddess Level" and "Outlaw" from the EP Stamp on It released by SM Entertainment
 2022: Red Velvet - "Zoom" from the EP "The ReVe Festival 2022 – Birthday" released by SM Entertainment
 2022: LE SSERAFIM - "No Celestial" from the EP "Antifragile" released by Source
 2022: Tomorrow X Together - "Thursday's Child Has Far to Go" from the album "Minisode 2: Thursday's Child" released by Big Hit / Republic
 2022: LE SSERAFIM - "The Great Mermaid" and "Sour Grapes" from the EP "Fearless" released by Source
 2022: Red Velvet - "Wildside", "Jackpot", "#Cookie Jar", "Cause It's You" from the album "Bloom" released by SM Japan
 2022: Yunho - "Sairen" (サイレン) (You Go Ahead)" from the album "Kimi Wa Gou Gou / You Go Ahead" released by Avex Trax
 2022: Koda Kumi - "Atlas" from the album "Heart" released by Rhythm Zone
 2021: Hurricane - "Set The World on Fire" Single released by Stema Production
 2021: Girls Generation Oh!GG - "Melody" from EP "2021 Winter SM Town: SMCU Express" released by SM Entertainment
 2021: Max Changmin (TVXQ) - "HUMAN" from the EP "HUMAN" released by Avex Trax
 2021: Billlie - "The Rumor" from the EP "The Billage of Perception: Chapter One" released by Mystic Story
 2021: BoA - "My Dear" single released by Avex Trax
 2021: The Boyz - "Hypnotized" from the single "Maverick" released by Cre.ker Entertainment
 2021: Twice - "F.I.L.A. (Fall in Love Again)" from the album Formula of Love: O+T=<3 released by JYP Entertainment (#1 Billboard US World Albums |#3 Billboard US 200)
 2021: ITZY -"B[oo]m-Boxx" and "Love Is" from the EP "Crazy in Love" released by JYP Entertainment
 2021: Stray Kids - "Secret Secret" from the EP "Noeasy" released by JYP Entertainment
 2021: Red Velvet - "Queendom" single from the EP "Queendom" released by SM Entertainment
 2021: 2PM - "Moon & Back" from the EP "Must" released by JYP Entertainment
 2021: Twice - "Baby Blue Love" from the EP "Taste of Love" released by JYP Entertainment (#1 Billboard US World Albums)
 2021: VIZE x Papa Roach - "CORE (That's Who We Are)" single released by Sony Music
 2021: Wendy - "Like Water" single from the EP "Like Water" released by SM Entertainment
 2021: WayV - "Good Time" from the EP "Kick Back" released by SM Entertainment
 2021: U-KNOW - "La Rosa" from the album "Noir" released by SM Entertainment
 2021: Lizzy Wang feat. Julie Bergan - "Flexy" single released by Warner Music China
 2021: Alejandro Fuentes feat. Tshawe & Admiral P -"Miss Favela" single released by Sony Music Norway
 2021: Victon - "Flip A Coin" from the EP "Voice: The Future is Now" released by Play M Entertainment
 2021: Chief 1 & Thomas Buttenschøn - "Høyt Over Skyerne" single released by Chiefment
 2021: Cherry Bullet - "Keep Your Head Up" from the EP "Cherry Rush" released by FNC Entertainment
 2020: Twice - "Queen" freom the EP "Eyes Wide Open" released by JYP Entertainment
 2020: Steve Forest & Te Pai ft. Damien McFly - "Head Above The Water" single release
 2020: Verivery - "Get Outta My Way" from the EP "Face Us" released by Jellyfish Entertainment
 2020: Everglow - "Untouchable" from the EP "−77.82X−78.29" released by Yuehua Entertainment
 2020: AleXa - "Revolution" from the mini-album DECOHERENCE released by ZB Label
 2020: LOONA - "Fall Again" from the EP "12:00" released by Blockberry Creative (#1 Billboard US Heatseekers Albums)
 2020: Celina Sharma - "Insecure" single released by EMI Virgin / Universal Music
 2020: GWSN - "Bazooka" single from the album The Keys released by Sony Music Korea
 2020: ITZY - "I Don't Wanna Dance" from the album IT'z Me released by JYP Entertainment
 2020: Han Seung-Woo - "Fever / Sacriface" from the EP "Fame" released by Play M Entertainment
 2019: Red Velvet - "Love Is The Way" from the album The ReVe Festival:Finale released by SM Entertainment (#1 US iTunes Charts)
 2019: EXO - "Trouble" from the album Obsession released by SM Entertainment (#1 Billboard US World Albums | #1 Gaon South Korean album charts) Certified 3 x Platinum Album - more than 750.000 sold units
 2019: Taeyeon - "Spark" single from the album Purpose released by SM Entertainment
 2019: Super Junior - "I Think I" single from the album Time_Slip released by SM Entertainment (#1 Gaon South Korean album charts) Certified Platinum Album - more than 365.000 sold units
 2019: BVNDIT - "Dumb" single from the EP BE! released by MNH Entertainment
 2019: Red Velvet - "Love Is The Way" from the album The ReVe Festival: Day 2 released by SM Entertainment (#1 Gaon South Korean album charts)
 2019: Ailee - "Headlock" from the album butterFLY released by DreamT Entertainment
 2019: Purplebeck - Crystal Ball EP released by Mystic Entertainment
 2019: U-KNOW - "Blue Jeans" from the album True Colors released by SM Entertainment
 2019: Twice - "Dance The Night Away" (Japanese version) from the album #Twice2 released by Warner Music Japan (#1 Billboard Japan Hot Albums | more than 450.000 sold units)
 2019: Taemin - "Want" single from the EP Want released by SM Entertainment (#1 Gaon South Korean album charts)
 2019: Alejandro Fuentes - "Emma Emma" single released by Dsign Music
 2019: Theo Lundestad Lawrence - "Break My Heart" single released by Dsign Music
 2018: Red Velvet - "Sassy Me" from the album RBB (Really Bad Boy) released by SM Entertainment (#1 Billboard US Heatseeekers Albums | #2 Billboard US World Albums)
 2018: Roy Wang - "Will You" single released by Beijing Time Fengjun Culture & Entertainment
 2018: E-girls - "Pink Champagne" from the album E.G. 11 released by Rhythm Zone / Avex Music
 2018: Chung Ha - "Cherry Kisses" from the album Blooming Blue released by MNH Entertainment
 2018: Key - "This Life" from the album Face released by SM Entertainment
 2018: NCT 127 - "Simon Says" single from the album Regular-Irregular released by SM Entertainment (#1 Billboard World Digital Songs | Platinum Certified Album 433.000+ sales)
 2018: Red Velvet - "#Cookie Jar" single from the EP #Cookie Jar released by Avex Trax (#3 Billboard Japan Hot Albums)
 2018: Twice - "Dance The Night Away" single from the album Summer Nights released by JYP Entertainment (#1 Billboard Korea K-POP 100 | 2 X Platinum Certified Album 650.000+ sales)
 2018: Twice - "Dejavu" from the EP What Is Love? released by JYP Entertainment (#3 Billboard Japan Hot Albums | Platinum Certified Album 433.000+ sales | winner of 33rd Golden Disc Awards)
 2018: TVXQ - "Broken" from the album New Chapter No. 1: The Chance of Love released by SM Entertainment
 2018: Klingande - "Rebel Yell feat. Krishane" single released by Ultra Music
 2018: SHINee - "You & I" from the album The Story Of Light released by SM Entertainment
 2018: Koda Kumi - "Sweetest Taboo" from the album AND released by Rhythm Zone
 2018: EXO - "Love Me Right" from the album Countdown released by SM Entertainment (#1 Billboard Japan Hot Albums)
 2018: Jonghyun - "I'm So Curious" from the album Poet  Artist released by SM Entertainment (#1 Billboard US World Albums)
 2017: Cazzi Opeia - "Wild Ones" single released by Cosmos Music / Superior Recordings
 2017: Matt Terry - "Weigh Me Down" from the album Trouble released by RCA
 2017: Namie Amuro - "Big Boys Cry" from the best of album Finally released by Avex Trax (#1 Oricon Albums Chart | #1 Billboard Japan Hot Albums Chart | #1 Billboard Japan Top Album Sales)
 2017: Girls' Generation - "Girls Are Back" from the album "Holiday Night" released by SM Entertainment (#1 Billboard US World Albums)
 2017: EXO - "What U Do?" from the album The War released by SM Entertainment (#1 Billboard US World Albums)
 2017: Dream Ami – "Surf On The Summer" from the album Re: Dream released by Rhythm Zone
 2017: Twice - "Someone Like Me" from the EP Signal released by JYP Entertainment (#3 Billboard US World Albums)
 2017: The Rampage from EXILE Tribe - "Frontiers" single released by Rhythm Zone
 2017: Koda Kumi - "Insane / Bassline" from the album W Face - Outside released by Rhythm Zone (#1 Oricon Japan Album Chart | #1 Oricon Japan Daily Chart)
 2017: VAV - "Venus (Dance With Me)" released by Loen Entertainment
 2017: Nabiha - "Young" single released by disco:wax
 2017: Luna, Hani & Solar – "Honey Bee" single released by Mystic Entertainment
 2017: Kamaliya - "Aphrodite" single released by TanArm Music
 2017: E-girls - "Pink Champagne" from the album E.G.CRAZY released by Rhythm Zone / Avex Music (#1 Billboard Japan Hot Albums & #1 Billboard Japan Top Album Sales)
 2016: E-girls - "Pink Champagne" single released by Rhythm Zone / Avex Music (#2 Billboard Japan Hot 100)
 2016: Justice Crew - "Pop Dat Buckle" single released by Sony Music Australia
 2016: In Stereo - "Girlfriend" single released by Warner Music Australia
 2016: Hyolyn - "Paradise" from the EP It's Me released by Starship Entertainment
 2016: Nathan Sykes - "Kiss Me Quick" from the album Unfinished Business released by Global Entertainment
 2016: B.A.P - "Skydive" from the album Noir released by Loen Entertainment (#1 Billboard US World Albums)
 2016: Krishane - "Found Da Boi feat. Wande Coal" single released by Atlantic Records UK
 2016: Apink - "Boom Pow Love" from the album Pink Revolution released by A Cube / Loen Entertainment
 2016: Red Velvet - "Bad Dracula" from the EP Russian Roulette released by SM Entertainment
 2016: Ricky Martin - "Vente Pa'Ca feat. Maluma" single released by Sony Music Latin (#1 Billboard US Latin Airplay, #1 Billboard Mexico Airplay, #1 Billboard Mexico Espanol Airplay, #1 Billboard US Latin Pop Songs, #1 Billboard US Tropical Airplay, #60 on the toplist of most watched videos in the world on YouTube)
 2016: Krishane - "Inconsiderate feat. Patoranking" single released by Atlantic Records UK
 2016: Vyan - "Castle" single released by Spinnup
 2016: Vyan - "Hard To Break" single released by Spinnup
 2016: BaekHyun (EXO) & Suzy (miss A) - "Dream" single released by Mystic Entertainment (#1 Korea Gaon Music Digital Chart in January | #1 Korea Gaon Music Album Chart | #3 Billboard US World Digital Songs
 2015: f(x) - "Deja Vu" from the album 4 Walls released by SM Entertainment (#1 Billboard US World Albums
 2015: EXO - "Love Me Right" single released by Avex Trax in Japan (#1 Billboard Japan Hot 100| #1 Japan Oricon Weekly CD Single Chart in Japan
 2015: Brown Eyed Girls - "Warm Hole" from the album Basic released by Loen Entertainment
 2015: Twice - "Truth" from the album The Story Begins released by JYP Entertainment
 2015: Yim Jae Beum - "Name" single released by ShowPLAY
 2015: Sweet California - "Good Lovin'" from the album Head For The Stars released by Warner Music Spain
 2015: Red Velvet - "Red Dress" and "Oh Boy" from the album The Red released by SM Entertainment (#1 Billboard US World Albums)
 2015: Jun Jin - "Wow Wow Wow" from the EP Real released by LOEN Entertainment
 2015: Arashi - "Imaging Crazy" from the album Arashi Live Tour 2014 & "The Digitalian" released by J Storm in Japan (#1 Japan Oricon DVD Chart
 2015: Girls' Generation - "Bump It" and "Paradise" from the album Lion Heart released by SM Entertainment (#1 Billboard US World Albums
 2015: Nathan Sykes - "Kiss Me Quick" single released by Global Entertainment (#1 Billboard US Dance Club Songs Chart
 2015: 9 Muses - "Hurt Locker" single from the EP Special Summer Edition released by Star Empire Entertainment
 2015: EXO - "Love Me Right" single from the album Love Me Right released by SM Entertainment (#1 Billboard US World Albums
 2015: Girls' Generation - "Catch Me If You Can" single released by SM Entertainment (#2 Billboard US World Digital Songs
 2015: Kim Feel - "Marry Me" single released by CJ E&M
 2015: miss A - "Melting" from the EP Colors released by JYP Entertainment
 2015: Amber - "Shake That Brass" from the album Beautiful released by SM Entertainment (#2 Billboard US World Albums
 2015: Julie Ervik - "Last Love" single released by Dsign Music
 2015: Neon Hitch - "Sparks" - single released by WeRNeon & Dsign Music
 2015: School of Oz - The world's first "Hologram Musical" premiered 14 January in Seoul by SM Entertainment
 2015: Jonghyun - "Hallelujah" and "Crazy" from the album Base released by SM Entertainment (#1 Billboard US World Albums
 2015: Alex Karlsson - "Streetlights" single released by Dsign Music
 2015: Girls' Generation-TTS - "I Like The Way" from the album Dear Santa released by SM Entertainment
 2014: Arashi - "Imaging Crazy" from the album The Digitalian released by J Storm in Japan (#1 on Japan Oricon Album Chart
 2014: Daichi Miura - "Bring It Down" single released by Sonic Groove
 2014: Super Junior - "This Is Love" and "Let's Dance" from the album Mamacita released by SM Entertainment (#1 Billboard US World Albums
 2014: Red Velvet - "Happiness" single released by SM Entertainment
 2014: Girls' Generation - "Genie", "Beep Beep" and "Love & Girls" from the album The Best released by EMI Records Japan (#1 Billboard Japanese Top Albums
 2014: Kylie Minogue - "Kiss Me Once" from the album Kiss Me Once released by Parlophone (#1 Australian Album Charts | #2 UK Album Charts
 2014: Girls' Generation - "Soul" from the album Mr. Mr. released by SM Entertainment (#1 Billboard US Heatseekers Albums | #1 Gaon Albums Chart | #3 Billboard US World Albums
 2014: BoA - "Call My Name" from the album Who's Back? released by Avex Trax
 2014: Koda Kumi - "LOL" from the album Bon Voyage released by Rhythm Zone
 2014: Boys Republic - the single "Video Game" released by Universal Music Korea
 2014: TVXQ - "Love Again" and "Rise" from the album Tense released by SM Entertainment (#2 Billboard US World Albums
 2014: Kamaliya - "Never Wanna Hurt You (Bad Love Baby)" single released by Ministry Of Sound
 2013: EXO - "The Star" from the album Miracles In December released by SM Entertainment (#1 Billboard US World Albums)
 2013: Fatin Shidqia -  "Jangan Kau Bohong"  and  "Sadar Dibatas Sabar" from the album For You released by Sony Music Indonesia (#1 on Indonesian Album Charts | Won Best Album of the Year | Won best Pop Album of the Year
 2013: Girls' Generation - "Find Your Soul" from the game "Blade & Soul" by Tencent
 2013: Girls' Generation - "Beep Beep" and "Love & Girls" from the album Love & Peace released by SM Entertainment (#1 Japan Oricon Weekly Album Chart | #2 on Billboard JapanTop Albums
 2013: Super Junior - "Candy" from the single Blue World released by Avex Trax
 2013: Shinee - "Destination" from the EP Everybody released by SM Entertainment (#2 Billboard US World Albums
 2013: Isac Elliot - "Can't Give Up On Love" from the album Wake Up World released by Sony Music Finland (#1 on Finnish Album Charts
 2013: Boys Republic - Identity album released by Universal Korea
 2013: Spica - "Tonight" single released by CJ E&M Music
 2013: Faky - "Better Without You" single released by Rhythm Zone
 2013: f(x) - "Rum Pum Pum Pum" single released by SM Entertainment (#1 Billboard K-Pop Hot 100)
 2013: f(x) - "Rum Pum Pum Pum" and "Toy" from the album Pink Tape released by SM Entertainment (#1 Billboard US World Albums
 2013: Girls' Generation - "Love & Girls" single released by SM Entertainment (#3 Billboard Japan Hot 100
 2013: EXO - "Wolf" single from the album XOXO released by SM Entertainment (#1 Billboard US World Albums
 2013: Lee Hyori - "Bad Girls" single from the album Monochrome released by B2M Entertainment (#1 Billboard K-Pop Hot 100
 2013: Lee Hyori - "Trust me, Special, Amor Mio, Going Crazy, Oars" albumtracks from the album Monochrome released by B2M Entertainment
 2013: Boys Republic - "Party Rock" single released by Universal Korea
 2013: Namie Amuro - "Big Boys Cry" single from the album Feel released by Avex Trax
 2013: Shinee - "Hitchhiking" single from the album Chapter 1. Dream Girl – The Misconceptions of You released by SM Entertainment (#2 Billboard US World Albums
 2013: F.A.N.S. - "Nave Espacial" from the album Despegamos released by Sony Music
 2013: Kamaliya - "Love Me Like" single from the album Club Opera released by Embassy Of Music
 2013: Kamaliya - "I'm Alive" single from the album Club Opera released by Embassy Of Music
 2013: Girls' Generation - "I Got a Boy" single released by SM Entertainment (#1 Billboard K-Pop Hot 100)
 2013: Girls' Generation - "I Got a Boy" from the album I Got a Boy released by SM Entertainment (#1 Billboard World Albums | (#1 on South Korea Gaon Monthly Digital Chart
 2013: Super Junior-M - "Break Down" title track from the album Break Down released by SM Entertainment (#1 Billboard US World Albums
 2013: DJ Antoine - "We Will Never Grow Old", "Beautiful" and "Now Or Never" from the album Sky Is The Limit released by Kontor Records
 2013: Blue - "I Can" single from the album Roulette released by Island Records
 2013: Kamaliya - album Club Opera all songs co-written and produced released by Embassy Of Music
 2012: Eric Saade - single "Marching (In The Name Of Love) from the album Forgive Me released by Roxy Recordings
 2012: Crystal Kay - "Come Back To Me" from the album Vivid released by Universal Music Japan
 2012: Crystal Kay - "What We Do" single from the album Vivid released by Universal Music Japan
 2012: Jasmine - "B*TCH*S" from the album Complexxx released by Sony Music
 2012: Kamaliya - "Butterflies" single from the album Club Opera released by Ministry Of Sound
 2012: Jolin Tsai - "The Great Artist" (大藝術家, Dà Yì Shù Jiā) single from the album Muse released by Warner Music Taiwan
 2012: Girls' Generation - "Beep Beep" from the single "Flower Power" released by Universal Music
 2012: Girls' Generation - "Girls & Peace" from the album Girls & Peace released by Universal Music (#3 Billboard Japanese Top Albums | #3 on Japan Oricon Weekly Album Charts
 2012: Coco Lee - "Stuck on You" single & album track released by Sony Music
 2012: Rainbow - "Energy" from the album Over the Rainbow released by Universal Sigma (#10 on Japan Oricon Weekly Album Chart
 2011: SM Town - "For the First Time", "Like a Dream", and "1, 2, 3" from the album 2011 Winter SMTown – The Warmest Gift, released by SM Entertainment
 2011: Blue - "I Can" single and the UK entry to the Eurovision Song Contest 2011
 2011: Daichi Miura - "Illusion Show" from the album D.M. released by Avex Entertainment
 2011: Edita Abdieski - "When The Music Is Over" from the album One released by Sony Music
 2011: f(x) - "Dangerous" from the album Pinocchio released by SM Entertainment
 2011: Anders | Fahrenkrog - "Nathalie" and "Wicked Love" from the album Two released by Universal Music
 2011: Elva Hsiao - "100 Fen De Wen (100分的吻)" from the album I'm Ready released by Gold Typhoon
 2011: Chocolat - "I Like It" from the album I Like It released by Paramount Music
 2011: TVXQ - "I Think U Know" from the album Tone released by Avex Trax (#1 Billboard Japan Top Albums | #1 on Japan Oricon Album Chart | #1 on South Korean Album Charts
 2011: Mariann Rosa - "Download My Kisses" single released by PopJoy
 2010: Jennifer Rush - "Echoes Love" from the album Now Is the Hour
 2010: BoA - "Hurricane Venus" from the album Copy & Paste released by SM Entertainment
 2010: BoA - "I'm OK" from the album Copy & Paste released by SM Entertainment
 2010: Jessica Sutta ex-Pussycat Dolls - "Jack in the Box"
 2009: Namie Amuro - "Fast Car" from the album Past Future released by Avex Trax (#1 Japan Oricon Album Charts | #1 Taiwan Album Charts | #1 Korean Album Charts
 2009: Girls' Generation - "Genie" from the album Tell Me Your Wish (Genie) released by SM Entertainment (#4 Billboard Japan Hot 100 | Winner of Golden Disk Awards
 2009: RBD - "Puedes Ver Pero No Tocar" from the album Para Olvidarte De Mí released by EMI Mexico
 2009: Jeanette Biedermann - "All Mine" from the album Undress to the Beat released by Universal Music
 2009: Leki & The Sweet Mints - Singles "Obsessive" and "Love Me Another Day" released by Universal Music Belgium
 2009: Stefanie Heinzmann - "Bag It Up" from the album Roots To Grow released by Seoul Records
 2009: Indra - "Upper hand (Sexy mama)" single from the album One Woman Show released by Warner Music France
 2009: Big Ali - "Hunger" from the album Louder released by Warner Music France
 2008: Monrose - "You Can Look (But You Can Not Touch)" from the album I Am released by Starwatch/Warner
 2008: Aloha from Hell - "You" from the album No More Days to Waste released by Sony Music
 2008: Nikki Kerkhof - "Inconsolable" from the album Naked released by Sony BMG
 2008: Nádine - "For The Best" from the album This Time I Know released by EMI
 2008: Nevena Tsoneva - "Imeto mi" single released by Universal Music
 2007: Monrose - "Leading Me On" and "Say Yes" from the album Strictly Physical released by Starwatch/Warner
 2007: Room 2012 - "Haunted" from the album Elevator released by Starwatch/Warner
 2007: Venke Knutson - "Holiday" single released by Universal Music
 2007: Venke Knutson Co-wrote and produced the album Crush released by Universal Music

Awards

Songwriting Camps (Song:Expo) 
 Robin Jenssen founded the annual songwriting camp called Song:Expo in 2011. This is the world's biggest songwriting camp and in 2020 there were more than 250 songwriters attending from 6 continents.
 Robin Jenssen has been arranging songwriting camps in Trondheim, Oslo, Hamar and Kristiandsand (Norway), Stockholm (Sweden), Reykjavik (Iceland), Seoul (Korea), Los Angeles (USA), Tokyo (Japan), Aarhus (Denmark), Bangkok (Thailand), Lijang (China) and Sofia (Bulgaria).

Studio Locations 
 In January 2019 Robin Jenssen co-founded EKKO Music Lab, a 13 studio-complex located in the So-Fo area of Stockholm, Sweden. Songwriting camps are being arranged at the EKKO Music Lab on a regualar basis.
 In January 2020 Dsign Music opened up their new studio facilities at Musikkbyen in Trondheim as a part of a 12 studio-complex.

Musicals
While living in Los Angeles from 2013 to 2015, Dsign Music wrote six of the songs featured in the world’s first hologram musical called “SCHOOL OZ” starring SMTOWN Artists TVXQ! (Max), EXO (Suho & Xiumin), f(x) (Luna), SHINee (Key), and Red Velvet (Seulgi). The musical was running at the Hologram Theater located in the COEX Shopping Center in Seoul, Korea. Dsign Music co-wrote the rock musical “Walhalla” together with Joern-Uwe Fahrenkrog-Petersen (former member of NENA). Dsign Music wrote the cabaret musical “Shanghai Rose”, which is being re-written to become a TV-series.

References

External links
 

Entertainment companies of Norway
Music production companies
Record production teams
Songwriting teams
Norwegian record producers
Music organisations based in Norway